Peter Elliott (born August 19, 1958) is a British pharmacologist and renown drug developer who has initiated various clinical trials (via multiple IND's) across a wide range of disease areas, and is the co-developer of Velcade, a drug used to treat multiple myeloma.

Early life and education 
Elliott was born in Cardiff, Wales and attended Llanishen High school before being accepted to study Pharmacology at Chelsea College, University of London (1979-1981). During this period he also spent a year gaining research experience at The Medical Clinic, Tubingen, Germany, working with Professor Peter A. Berg on the autoimmune disease, Primary Biliary Cirrhosis (1978-1980). After graduating, Elliott embarked upon a Ph.D., under the supervision of Dr's Leslie and Susan Iversen at Cambridge University, where he was a member of Trinity College (1981-1984). He was the first person to undertake a joint Ph.D, with them and the last before they joined Merck, Sharp & Dohme. His research focused on the behavioural effects of neurokinins on catecholamine systems and was carried out at the Department of Psychology, Cambridge University, and the Medical Research Council's (MRC) Neurochemical Pharmacology Unit (NCPU), at Addenbrookes Hospital. During his Ph.D., Elliott published seven research papers, including the top two scientific journals, Nature and Science. The Nature paper was one of the first publications to utilize monoclonal antibodies as pharmaceutical tools. The monoclonal antibody to Substance P, used in the paper, was generated from an adjacent laboratory of Dr. Cesar Milstein.

Academic career 
In 1984, Dr. Elliott was granted a research Fellowship to work with Dr. Charles B. Nemeroff at the Department of Psychiatry, Duke University. There he investigated the role of neurotensin on dopamine systems in the central nervous system, in relation to psychiatric disorders such as schizophrenia. The following year he moved to  Yale University & The Connecticut Mental Health Center to work with Dr. Michael J. Bannon (1985-1986) to investigate the effects of neurokinins on molecular aspects of dopamine systems, and their potential role in psychiatry, and in particular, their ability to modulate the tardive dyskinesias elicited by certain neuroleptics. Subsequently, Dr. Elliott took a post-doctoral position in the Pharmacology Department, McGill University (1986-1988) where he focused on animal models of Alzheimer's disease, as well as developing new monoclonal antibodies for research purposes. During his tenure at McGill, Dr. Elliott was also invited to spend time, as a visiting scholar, with Dr. Erminio Costa at the FIDIA-Georgetown University Institute for Neuroscience, where he explored the ability of nerve growth factor to modulate/repair degenerative diseases of the central nervous system. After completing his education and research in academia, Peter moved into the pharmaceutical-biotechnology arena where he worked on developing new drugs to treat multiple conditions including, inflammation, diabetes, pain and cancer. Elliott has over 300 publications including many in top tier journals, such as Nature, Science, Cell, P.N.A.S., J. Medicinal Chemistry, Brain Research, Neuroscience, Blood, Cancer Research, and J. Clinical Oncology.

Pharmaceutical and biotechnology career 
During the second year at McGill, Dr. Elliott was recruited to Glaxo Group Research, in the UK (now GlaxoSmithKline) to head up their Parkinson's and Movement Disorder group. During this time (1988-1993). he also worked on preclinical aspects of the drug, Ondansetron (a novel and first in class antiemetic drug), as well as exploring novel non-opioid opportunities to develop drugs to treat pain. In addition to leading groups at GSK he also was an external supervisor for multiple Ph.D., studentships set up with academic groups he collaborated with throughout the UK. Dr. Elliott also co-authored the Glaxo Pocket Guide to Pharmacology during this period. In 1993, Dr. Elliott was hired by the biotechnology company, Alkermes Inc. as head of Pharmacology (1993-1996) where he focused on novel drugs to treat stroke, and also on a permeabilizing agent, RMP-7, that enabled other drugs to treat glioma, and opportunistic infections in AIDS patients. In 1996, he was offered the head of Pharmacology at the biotechnology company, the ProScript (1996-2001). Here, along with Dr. Julian Adams, he co-developed a novel, anti-cancer agent, Velcade (PS-341), currently used to treat multiple myeloma. The clinical program was supported by National Cancer Institute (NCI; Division of Cancer Treatment and Diagnosis, Developmental Therapeutics Program). ProScript was ultimately merged with LeukoSite, and then acquired by Millennium Pharmaceuticals (MLNM- now Takeda) for $635mm.  Dr. Elliott was intimately involved with these corporate transactions.  MLNM was subsequently purchased by Takada who currently market Velcade. Throughout this time, Peter led the clinical development of PS-341 until its final Phase III trial when it was rapidly approved by the FDA, and other regulatory authorities around the world. Dr. Elliott was also the project leader of an anti-stroke agent, PS-519, that completed Phase IIa clinical trials. Support for the development of PS-519 was, in part, achieved by Dr. Elliott being awarded a $100,000 SBIR grant, and a CRADA contract with the Walter Reed Army Institute of Research. Both PS-341 and PS-519 were proteasome inhibitors, and first in class in their therapeutic areas.

When leaving Millennium, Dr. Elliott was Senior Vice President of Pharmacology & Drug Development. Following the launch of Velcade, Dr. Elliott joined a new biotechnology company, CombinatoRx (CRx) as Executive Vice President of Product Development (2001-2005). Here he launched numerous combination products into various inflammatory areas (asthma, psoriasis, rheumatoid arthritis) and oncology.  During his time at CRx, Dr. Elliott was part of the management team that completed a successful $42 MM IPO as well as gaining $20 MM support from the Singaporean government to start up a new company in Singapore to mimic the CRx model in the USA. In 2005, Peter was recruited to another biotechnology company, Sirtris (2005-2009). The company focused on diseases of ageing including diabetes, oncology and inflammatory conditions. Dr. Elliott was again part of the management team that completed a successful $60 MM IPO, and additional rounds of funding. He completed clinical trials in diabetics before the company was acquired by GSK in 2008 for $720 MM. Dr. Elliott remained for the transition period, and then left in 2009, at this time he was Head of Research and Development. Subsequently Dr. Elliott set up his own consulting company, Wapiti Pharmaceutical Consulting, Marlboro, MA, USA. Since then, Peter has been in demand from both large pharmaceutical and biotechnology companies to help develop compounds in multiple therapeutic areas, undertake in-licensing/due diligence, and help in mergers/acquisitions.  During his professional career, Dr. Elliott has also presented preclinical and clinical data, at both National and International meetings, focused on numerous therapeutic areas. He has been an active member of multiple societies throughout his career, and has been invited to give seminars at many Universities and Business schools around the world. He has participated on multiple scientific advisory boards, and advises on drug development pathways and regulatory issues.  Dr. Elliott is also the co-author of numerous patents relating to procedures and drugs worked on during his time in academia and within the industrial setting.

Personal interests 
While at Chelsea College, Peter was Vice President of Entertainments, and continues to hold a strong interest in music and theatre. Further, Peter has a passion for malt whisky, and is currently writing a book on the subject. Besides being a strong swimmer, and previous life guard, and personal survival instructor, Peter enjoys kayaking and walking. He has traveled extensively (120 countries to date), enjoys photography, playing chess, reading and cooking. Peter married Laura Bird (b 1957. d 2010) in 1983 and has a daughter (Sian Louise, b 1984) and a son (Kevan Thomas b 1987).

References 

1958 births
Living people
British pharmacologists